The women's singles tennis event at the 2018 Asian Games took place at the Tennis Court of Jakabaring Sport City, Palembang, Indonesia from 19 to 24 August 2018.

Wang Qiang was the defending champion and successfully defended her title defeated compatriot Zhang Shuai in the final. Ankita Raina and Liang En-shuo won the bronze medals.

Schedule
All times are Western Indonesia Time (UTC+07:00)

Results
Legend
WO — Won by walkover

Finals

Top half

Section 1

Section 2

Bottom half

Section 3

Section 4

References
 Draw

External links
Official website

Tennis at the 2018 Asian Games